

D
 
 
 

Da

 
 
 
 
 
 
  
 
  (/, //)
 
 
 
 
 
 Daisy Archer (ID-1283)
 
  (/)
 
 
 
 
 
 
 
 
 
 
 
 
 
 
 
 
 
  (/)
  (/)
 
 
 
 
 
 
 
 
 
  (/)
 
 
 
  (/)
 
 
 
 
  (/)
  (/)
 
 
  (/)
 
 
 
 
 

De

  (/)
 
  (/)
 
 
 
 
  (/)
 
 
 
 
  (/)
 
 
 
 
 
  (/)
  (/)
 
  (/)
 
 
  (/)
  (//)
  (//)
 
 
 
 
 
 
 
 
  (//)
 
  (/)
 
 
  (/)
  (/)
  (/)
 
 
 
 
 
  (/)
 
  (/)
  (/)
  (/)
  (/)
  (//)
 
 
 
 
  (//)
  (/)
 
 
  (/)
 
  (/)
  (/)
 
 
 
  (/)
 
  (/)
  (/)
 
 
  (/)
  (//)
  (/)
 

Di

  (/)
  (/)
 
 
 
 
 
 
  (/)
 
 
  (/)
  (1797)
 
 
 
 
 
 
  (/)
  (/)
  (/)
  (1918/)
 
  (/)
 
 
 
 
 
 
 

Do

 
 
 
 
 
 
 
 
  (/)
 
 
 
 
 
  (/)
 
 
 
 
  (/)
  (//)
  (//)
 
  (/)
 
 
 
 
  (/)
 
 
  (/)
  (/)
 
 
 
 
 
 
 
  (/)
 
 
  (/, /)
  (/)
 
 
 
 
 
  (/)
 
  (/)
  (/)
  (/)
 

Dr–Dy 

 
 
 
 
 
  (//)
 
 
 
 
 
  (/)
 
  (/)
 
 
  (/)
  (//)
 
  (//)
 
 
 
 
 
 
  
 
  (/)
 
 
 
 
  (/)
 
 
  (//)
  (//)
  (/)   
 
  (/)
 
 
 
  (/)
 
 
  (/)
  (/)
 

E
 
 
 
 
 

Ea–Ek 

  (/)
  (USRC)
 Eagle class patrol craft (USS Eagle No. 1 (PE-1) – USS Eagle No. 60 (PE-60))
 
 
 
  (/)
 
 
 
  (/)
  (/)
 
 
 
 
 
 
 
 
 
 
 
  (/)
 
 
  (/)
  (1928)
  (/)
 
 
 
 
  (/, /)
  (/)
 
 
 
 
 
  (//, //)
 
 
 
 
  (/)
 
 
 
 
 
 
 
 
 
 USS Edward Luckenbach (ID-1662)
  (/)
  (/)
 
 
 
 
 
  (/)
 
 
  (/, /)
 
 
 
 
 
 

El–Em 

 
 
 
 
  (/, /)
 
 
  (/)
 
 
 
  (/)
  (/)
 
 
  (/)
  (/)
 
 
 
 
 
 
 
 
 
 
 
 
  (/)
 
 
 
 
 
 
 
 
  (//)
  (/)
  (/)
 
  (/)
  (/)
 
 
 
 
  (/)
 
 
  (/)
 
 
 
 
 
 
 
 
  (/)
 
 
  (/)
 

En–Es 

 
 
 
  (/)
 
  (/)
 
  (/)
  (/)
 
  (/, /)
 
 
  (/)
 
 
 
  (/)
 
  (/)
 
 
 USS Enterprise (1776, ///)
 
  (/)
 
  (/)
  (//)
 
 
 
 
 
 
 
 
  (/)
 
  (/)
 
 
  (/)
  (/)
 
  (/)
 
 
 
 
  (/)
 
 
 
  (/)
 
 
  (//, /)
  (/)
 
 

Et–Ex 

  (/)
  (/)
 
  (/)
  (/)
 
 
  (/)
 
  (/)
  (/)
 
 
 
 
 
 
 
 
 
 
 
 
  (/)
 
  (/)
 
 
  (/)
  (/)
 
 
  (/)
 
  (/)
 
  (/)
  (1904, OSS 28)
 
 
 
  (/)

F
 
 
 
 
 
 

Fa

 
  (/)
 
 
 
 
 
 
 
 
 
  (/)
 
  (World War I, /, /)
  (//)
 
  (/)
 
 
  (/)
 
  (/)
 
 
  (/)
 
 
 
 
 
 
  (//)
 
 
 
 
  (/)

Fe–Fi 

  (/)
 
  (/)
 
  (/)
 
 
 
 
 
  (/)
 
 
 
 
 
  (/)
  (/)
 
 
 
 
 
  (//)
 
 
 
 
 
 
  (/)
 
 
  (/)
  (1879)
 
  (/)
  (/)
 
 
  (/)

Fl

 
 
 
 
 
 
 
  (/, /)
 
 
 
  (/)
 
  (/, /)
 
 
  (/, /)
 
 
 
  (/)
 
 
 
 
 
 
 
 
 
 
 
  (/)

Fo

 
  (/)
 
 
  (//)
 
 
  (/)
 
 
 
 
 
  (/)
 
 
  (///)
  (//)
  (/)
 
 
 
 
 
 
 
 
 
 
 
 
 
 
  (/)
  (/)
 
  (/)
 
 
 
  (/, /)
 

Fr–Fu 

  (/)
 
 
  (/)
 
  (/)
 
  (/)
 
  (/)
 
 
 
 
 
  (/)
 
 
  (/)
 
  (//)
 
 
 
  (/)
 
 
 
  (///)
 
 
 
 
 
 
 
  (//)
 
 
  (/)
 
 
  (/)
 
 
 
 
 
  (/)
 
 
 
  (/)
  (/)
  (/)
 
  (/)
 

References
 Dictionary of American Naval Fighting Ships, D
  Naval Vessel Register, D
 navy.mil: List of homeports and their ships
NavSource Naval History